Dark Shadows was an American gothic soap opera that aired weekdays on the ABC television network from June 27, 1966 to April 2, 1971. The show depicted the lives, loves, trials, and tribulations of the wealthy Collins family of Collinsport, Maine, where a number of supernatural occurrences take place.

The series became popular when vampire Barnabas Collins (Jonathan Frid) was introduced ten months into its run. It would also feature ghosts, werewolves, zombies, man-made monsters, witches, warlocks, time travel, and a parallel universe. A small company of actors each played many roles; as actors came and went, some characters were played by more than one actor. The show was distinguished by its melodramatic performances, atmospheric interiors, memorable storylines, numerous dramatic plot twists, adventurous music score, broad cosmos of characters, and heroic adventures. Unusual among the soap operas of its time, which were aimed primarily at adults, Dark Shadows developed a large teenage audience and a dedicated cult following. By 1969, it had become ABC's highest-rated daytime series.

The original network run of the show amassed 1,225 episodes. The success of the series spawned a media franchise that has included two feature films (House of Dark Shadows in 1970 and Night of Dark Shadows in 1971), a 1991 TV remake, a failed 2004 remake pilot, a 2012 film reboot directed by Tim Burton, and numerous spin-off novels and comics. Since 2006, the series has continued as a range of audio dramas produced by Big Finish Productions, featuring members of the original cast including David Selby, Lara Parker, and Kathryn Leigh Scott.

TV Guides list of all-time Top Cult Shows ranked the series #19 in 2004, and #23 in 2007.

History
Creator Dan Curtis claimed he had a dream in 1965 of a mysterious young woman on a train. The following day Curtis told his wife of the dream and pitched the idea as a TV series to ABC. Network officials greenlit production and Curtis began hiring crew members.

Art Wallace was hired to create a story from Curtis's dream sequence. Wallace wrote the story bible Shadows on the Wall, the proposed title for the show, later changed to Dark Shadows. Robert Costello was added as a line producer, and Curtis took on the creator and executive producer roles. Lela Swift, John Sedwick, and Henry Kaplan all agreed to be directors for the new series. Robert Cobert created the musical score and Sy Tomashoff designed the set.

Broadcast history
Perhaps one of ABC's first truly popular daytime series, along with the game show Let's Make a Deal (which had moved from its original home NBC in 1968), Dark Shadows found its demographic niche in teenagers coming home from school in time to watch the show at 4 p.m. Eastern/3 p.m. Central, where it aired for almost all of its network run, the exception being a 15-month stretch between April 1967 and July 1968, when it aired a half-hour earlier. Originally, it was aired in black-and-white, but the show went into color starting with the episode broadcast on August 11, 1967. It became one of ABC's first daytime shows to actually win the rating for its timeslot, leading to the demise of NBC's original Match Game and Art Linkletter's long-running House Party on CBS, both in 1969.

Dark Shadows began with a 4.1 rating in the 1965–66 TV season, tying for thirteenth place out of eighteen daytime dramas. The audience figures only improved slightly, to 4.3, in 1966–67. 1966 was a volatile year for soaps, and many ended their runs between the premiere date of Dark Shadows in June and the month of December. By that time, six months had passed, and Dark Shadows had failed to gain major traction. In June, it ranked #13 out of 18 soaps, and by December, the lower-rated offerings were gone and the show officially ranked #13 out of 13 soaps. "The show was limping along, really limping", head writer Sam Hall remembered, "and ABC said, 'We're canceling it. Unless you pick up in 26 weeks, you're finished.' [Series creator Dan Curtis] had always wanted to do a vampire picture, so he decided to bring a vampire — Barnabas Collins — to the series."

Barnabas was introduced in April 1967 and the fan response was swift and immediate. Coupled with a time slot change to 3:30 Eastern/2:30 Central, the fortunes of Dark Shadows rebounded, as many more teenagers found the program after tuning out the other offerings that may have been too "boring" to them. By May 1968, the series was still in last place (out of 12 offerings), but rose to a 7.3 rating, the rough equivalent (at that time) of gaining the viewership of three million households in the span of one year. Dark Shadows would return to its 4 p.m. Eastern/3 p.m. Central time slot in July 1968, without losing much of its audience at all. One Life to Live, which was launched by ABC in July 1968 in the 3:30 slot, also sought to reach the newfound young demographic.

The series reached its peak in popularity during a storyline set in the year 1897, broadcast from March 1969. By the end of May, Dark Shadows was ABC's most popular soap opera, and by late 1969 it was reaching between 7 and 9 million viewers on any given day, and ranking 11th out of a total 15 daytime dramas in that time period.

In November 1969, after nine months of some of Dark Shadows most intricate, intelligent storylines, the 1897 storyline came to an end. With ratings at an all-time high, the writers were under pressure to hold the audience. Their next storyline, known as "The Leviathans", proved to be a thematic misstep for the show and one from which it never recovered. Fans tended to dislike the portrayal of Barnabas as the pawn of some greater power. They were more interested in the archetypes of classic horror—the vampire, the witch, the werewolf—than in off-camera suggestion. The launch of Somerset in March 1970, a much-publicized spin-off of NBC's Another World,  also hurt the series considerably.

The release of the film House of Dark Shadows in September of that year is also thought to have caused TV ratings to fall, possibly due to parents, attending the film with their children, discouraging their choice of television viewing material due to the amount of blood spilled on screen. Beginning in the fall of 1970, several ABC stations across the country dropped the show due to falling viewership. Within six months, ratings dropped from 7.3 to 5.3. Ironically, Nielsen ratings for March 1971, the last full month that Dark Shadows was on the air, revealed that viewership had risen in its final weeks.

By early 1971, though, ABC was trying to cut costs in the face of harsh new economic realities including a national economic recession, a sharp dip in advertising revenue following the discontinuance of cigarette commercials, and a record-high number of competing soap operas—which were more expensive to produce than game or talk shows—on the networks' daytime schedules. Thus, the network began weeding out supposedly unproductive programming.

Despite its relatively high station clearances for its time slot and low production costs, Dark Shadows fell victim to the purge mainly because of its young audience, who usually did not make decisions about the purchasing of household goods and food products for the family, which were the two chief industries that bought airtime on daytime television in that era. Practically no other daytime show skewed so much under the 18–35 demographic threshold as Dark Shadows did. Furthermore, prime-time shows and movies with horror or science fiction themes (such as Star Trek, The Man from U.N.C.L.E.) had been on the decline for some time, and, of course, the serial appealed heavily to fanciers of those genres, people who usually did not express much interest in the often sentimental domestic or romantic themes on which traditional soaps had relied since their inception on radio in the 1930s. In addition and probably more decisively, the program experienced a precipitous drop in its ratings during its last two years on the air, falling from a peak of 8.4 in the 1968–69 television season to a 5.3 in 1970–71. Reflecting on the series' cancellation, in an interview included in a 2005 DVD release, series creator Curtis welcomed the show's cancellation, feeling it had run out of fresh ideas: "I was just hoping it was going to end. I couldn't squeeze my brain any harder to come up with just one more story. I just wanted to move on and out."

Despite many letters of protest from outraged fans, ABC canceled the five-year-old show on April 2, 1971, and replaced it the following Monday (April 5) with a new version of the hit 1960s game show Password. The rather abrupt ending of the series left some plotlines (such as Victoria Winters' parentage, and the story of the Jennings family) unfinished, although most of the plot threads came to a happy conclusion, via a voice-over done by Thayer David explaining future events in the final minute of the last episode.

The original cast reunited in 2003 for a special reunion play recorded for MPI, and in 2006 resumed production of Dark Shadows audio dramas for Big Finish (see below). These dramas have been ongoing for 10 seasons.

Episode numbering

A total of 1,225 episodes were produced but, during the course of its run, the show was preempted 20 times. ABC would compensate by occasionally skipping, double-numbering and, in one case, triple-numbering episodes in order to keep a show ending in a 5 or 0 airing on Fridays. This is why the last episode produced has #1245 when, in actuality, it was only the 1,225th episode produced.

Storylines

1966/7
 Victoria Winters' Parentage, episode 1 to 92
 Victoria Winters and her role as governess is inspired by title character in Charlotte Brontë's gothic novel Jane Eyre.

 Burke Devlin's Revenge For His Manslaughter Conviction, episode 1 to 201
 Burke Devlin and his motivation for returning is reminiscent of Alexandre Dumas' novel The Count of Monte Cristo.

 Roger Collins' Mysterious Car Crash, episode 13 to 32

 The Murder of Bill Malloy, episode 46 to 126

 Laura Collins the Phoenix, episode 123 to 192

 Jason McGuire Blackmails Elizabeth Collins Stoddard, episode 193 to 275

 The Arrival of the Vampire Barnabas Collins, episode 211 to 220
Elements of this storyline are inspired by the novel Dracula by Bram Stoker.

 The Kidnapping of Maggie Evans, episode 221 to 261

 Julia Hoffman's Attempt to Cure Barnabas, episode 265 to 351

 Barnabas Terrorizing Julia Hoffman, episode 352 to 365

1795
 Angelique Bouchard's Vampire Curse on Barnabas, episode 366 to 426

 Victoria Winters's Witchcraft Trial, episode 400 to 461
 The witchcraft trial involving Victoria Winters is inspired by Arthur Miller's play The Crucible. Reverend Trask's fate is inspired by Edgar Allan Poe's short story "The Cask of Amontillado."

 Nathan Forbes' Manipulation of Millicent Collins, episode 419 to 460
 Nathan's manipulation of Millicent is reminiscent of the 1938 play and the 1944 film Gaslight.

1968/9
 The Mystery of Jeff Clark, episode 461 to 665

 The Creation of Adam, episode 466 to 636
 The character of Adam is inspired by Mary Shelley's horror novel Frankenstein.

 The Dream Curse, episode 477 to 548

 Elizabeth's Fear of Being Buried Alive, episode 513 to 672
 This storyline is inspired by Edgar Allan Poe's short story "The Premature Burial."

 Nicholas Blair's Scheme to Create A Master Race, episode 549 to 633/634

 Chris Jennings' Werewolf Curse, episode 627 to 700

 The Ghosts of Quentin Collins and Beth Chavez Haunt Collinwood, episode 639 to 700
 The character of Quentin Collins and his role is inspired by Peter Quint in Henry James's gothic novel The Turn of the Screw.

1897
 Barnabas’ Mission to Save David Collins, episode 700 to 839
 The heartbeat that tortures Quentin is inspired by Edgar Allan Poe's short story "The Tell-Tale Heart."

 Jenny Collins, the Mad Woman in the Attic, episode 707 to 748
 Jenny Collins is inspired by the character of Bertha from Charlotte Brontë's gothic novel Jane Eyre.

 Laura Collins the Phoenix, episode 728 to 761
 Worthington Hall and Gregory Trask's running of it is inspired by Charles Dickens's novel Nicholas Nickleby.

 Magda Rakosi's Werewolf Curse on Quentin, episode 749 to 834
 The portrait of Quentin Collins is inspired by Oscar Wilde's gothic novel The Picture of Dorian Gray.

 Gregory Trask's Manipulation of Judith Collins, episode 762 to 884
 Gregory Trask's fate is inspired by Edgar Allan Poe's short story "The Cask of Amontillado".
 Mrs. Trask's murder is inspired by "The Manchurian Candidate"

 The Hand of Count Petofi, episode 778 to 814
 The hand of Count Petofi is inspired by William Fryer Harvey's short story "The Beast with Five Fingers".  Quentin's torture is inspired by Edgar Allan Poe’s short story "The Pit and the Pendulum."

 The Creation of Amanda Harris, episode 812 to 850
 The theme of an artist's falling in love with his own creation who is brought to life by supernatural forces is reminiscent of the classic Greek myth of Pygmalion.

 Josette's Return, episode 844 to 885

 Count Petofi Body Swaps with Quentin, episode 849 to 883
 The character of Count Petofi is based on the real-world Count of St. Germain, a Georgian-era courtier and man of science who claimed to be, and possibly was, the son of Francis II Rákóczi. In the 19th century, Theosophist legends claimed that he attained the secret of immortality.

1969/70
 Barnabas Falls Under the Control of the Leviathans, episode 886 to 950
 This storyline is inspired by H. P. Lovecraft’s shared universe known as "The Cthulhu Mythos," and particularly by the short story "The Dunwich Horror".

 The Mystery of Grant Douglas and Olivia Corey, episode 888 to 934
 This storyline is inspired by the Greek mythological tale of Orpheus and Eurydice.

 Chris Jennings' Werewolf Curse, episode 889 to 978

 The Leviathan Child, episode 891 to 929

 Jeb Hawkes the Leviathan Leader, episode 935 to 980

 The Ghosts of Gerard Stiles and Daphne Harridge Haunt Collinwood, episode 1071 to 1109
 This storyline is inspired by Henry James's gothic novel The Turn of the Screw.

1970 Parallel Time
 The Death of Angelique Collins, episode 969 to 1060
 This storyline is inspired by Daphne du Maurier's gothic novel Rebecca.

 Cyrus Longworth's Experiment, episode 978 to 1035
 This storyline is inspired by Robert Louis Stevenson's "chilling shocker" short novel Strange Case of Dr. Jekyll and Mr. Hyde.

1995
 The Destruction of Collinwood, episode 1061 to 1070

1840
 Barnabas' Infatuation with Roxanne Drew, episode 1081 to 1150

 The Head of Judah Zachery, episode 1117 to 1138

 Judah Zachery's Possession of Gerard Stiles, episode 1139 to 1197

 Quentin Collins' Witchcraft Trial, episode 1162 to 1197

1841 Parallel Time
 Bramwell Collins' and Catherine Harridge's Love Affair, episode 1186 to 1245
 This storyline is inspired by Emily Brontë's gothic novel Wuthering Heights.

 The Cursed Room Lottery, episode 1194 to 1245
 This storyline is inspired by Shirley Jackson's short story "The Lottery."

Production

Casting

Curtis set out to find the actress to play the girl on the train. Alexandra Isles (then Alexandra Moltke), a young actress with little experience, was discovered and cast in the role of Victoria Winters, an orphan who journeys to the mysterious, fictional town of Collinsport, Maine, to unravel the mysteries of her past.

Veteran film star Joan Bennett was soon cast as Victoria's employer Elizabeth Collins Stoddard,  a woman who had not left her home in over eighteen years. Stage actor Louis Edmonds was cast as Elizabeth's brother, a widower, Roger Collins. Another stage actress, Nancy Barrett, was then cast as Elizabeth's headstrong daughter Carolyn Stoddard, and child actor David Henesy was cast as Roger's troubled son David Collins.

As production on the series continued, many new and mysterious characters, played by unfamiliar actors and actresses, were introduced, but two early cast changes brought stage actors David Ford and Thayer David into the ensemble. Thayer David would go on to play several formidable villains over the course of the series. Michael Currie, as Constable Jonas Carter, was shortly replaced by veteran actor Dana Elcar, as Sheriff George Patterson. Most of the actors played multiple characters, and those characters often returned through flashbacks, the use of parallel timelines, or as ghosts.

Main cast
Character names noted with * indicates appearance of a counterpart in an alternate reality known as Parallel Time during episodes 969 to 1060 or 1186 to 1245.

Locations
Both theatrical films, House of Dark Shadows (1970) and Night of Dark Shadows (1971), were shot primarily on location at the Lyndhurst estate in Tarrytown, New York. For the TV series, Essex, Connecticut was the locale used for the town of Collinsport. Among the locations sited there are the Collinsport Wharf, Main Street, and the Evans Cottage. The Griswold Inn in Essex was used for the Collinsport Inn, and the town post office was used for the Collinsport Police Station. The Collinwood stand-in mansion used for the TV series is the Carey Mansion in Newport, Rhode Island, until August 2009 used by Salve Regina University. The exteriors for the "Old House," aka Collins House (the original Collinwood mansion) were filmed at Spratt Mansion, which was also located on the Lyndhurst estate; this mansion was destroyed by fire in 1969. The Lockwood-Mathews Mansion in South Norwalk, Connecticut, was also used for some scenes in House of Dark Shadows. Some outdoors shots for the series were filmed in the famous Sleepy Hollow Cemetery, not far from the Lyndhurst Mansion.

All of the interiors of the TV series were shot on sound stages at various ABC-owned studios in Manhattan. The early episodes were shot at ABC Studio TV-2 at 24 West 67th Street, and the rest of the episodes were shot at the smaller ABC Studio TV-16 at 433 West 53rd Street, now demolished; as of 2022, it is the site of a six-story, 60-unit apartment building.

Special effects
Working within the constraints of the live-to-tape format—with almost every scene done in one take—Dark Shadows displayed an unusually inventive use of costume, make-up, and in particular, special effects. Both time travel and ghosts allowed characters killed in earlier sequences to return, often in period clothing. Séances held in the old mansion were often visited by ghostly apparitions of quivering ectoplasm. Dream sequences included colorful psychedelic spectacles superimposed over ethereal, fog-filled fantasies. Individuals of normal appearance were transformed into hideous creatures of the netherworld. One episode was carefully edited so that a closeup of a clock on the set showed the exact time viewers in the Central time zone saw the clock.

Music
Of particular note is Bob Cobert's music score, which broke new ground for a television program. In September 1969 the original soundtrack to Dark Shadows, credited to the Robert Cobert Orchestra and featuring 16 tracks written or co-written by Cobert, reached no. 18 on Billboards Top 200 album chart. The song "Quentin's Theme" earned Cobert a Grammy nomination for Best Instrumental Theme, but lost to John Barry's theme for Midnight Cowboy. A recording of "Quentin's Theme" by the Charles Randolph Grean Sounde was released as a single, and in August 1969, when the TV series was something of a phenomenon, it peaked at no. 13 on Billboards Hot 100 chart (and no. 3 on its Easy Listening chart).

Reception

Critical response
Dark Shadows had a rocky beginning. Critics were quick to deem the series boring for its heavy use of unknown actress Isles and the slow pace. Variety, in its review on June 29, 1966, of Dark Shadows first episode: "Writer Art Wallace took so much time getting into his story that the first episode of the Neo Gothic soaper added up to one big contemporary yawn." The earliest episodes concerned menacing but unfulfilled conflicts, threatened revenge, then an attempted murder, and, finally, a murder. The supernatural elements that later made the show a hit, were slow to appear and only hinted at until episodes 52 and 70 in which the audience finally sees compelling evidence of a ghost.

Ratings

1965–1966 season
 1. As the World Turns (13.9)
 13. Dark Shadows (4.1)
 16. Never Too Young (3.9)

1966–1967 season
 1. As the World Turns (12.7)
 12. Dark Shadows (4.3)
 13. A Flame in the Wind (4.0)

1967–1968 season
 1. As the World Turns (13.6)
 12. Dark Shadows (7.3)
 13. One Life to Live (4.3)

1968–1969 season
 1. As the World Turns (13.8)
 11. Dark Shadows (8.4)
 14. Hidden Faces (3.3)

1969–1970 season
 1. As the World Turns (13.6)
 12. Dark Shadows (7.3)
 19. The Best of Everything (1.8)

1970–1971 season
 1. As the World Turns (12.4)
 16. Dark Shadows (5.3)
 18. A World Apart (3.4)

Media

Home media
Unlike some other soap operas of its era, the episodes of Dark Shadows all were preserved in some format, although one episode exists only as an audio recording and several color episodes only have black and white kinescopes available.

MPI Home Video currently holds the home media rights to the series. All episodes were issued on VHS from 1989 through 1995. Episodes 210–1245 (Barnabas' arrival through to the end of the series) have been released on DVD in 26 Collections from 2002 through 2006. Episodes 1–209 were released in 2007 under the title of Dark Shadows: The Beginning. On April 3, 2012, MPI re-released the 32 Collections. The first (and sometimes, the second) collection (from Barnabas's introduction) has been released internationally, but due to generally low sales, this has been the extent of the international release of the series.

On April 10, 2012, MPI released a "Limited Edition Complete Series" box set in the shape of a coffin. The 131 DVDs are housed in 22 individual plastic cases, with the spines looking upward to show the entire body of Barnabas lying asleep in his coffin. Only 2,500 numbered copies of these were made, with each set including a limited edition card signed by original series star Jonathan Frid. A similar but unlimited "Deluxe Edition" set was subsequently released on July 10, 2012, without the limited edition card signed by Jonathan Frid and without the serial limitation number plate on the bottom of the box.

Films

MGM released a feature film titled House of Dark Shadows in 1970. Dan Curtis directed it, and Sam Hall and Gordon Russell wrote the screenplay. Many cast members from the soap opera, including Jonathan Frid, Grayson Hall, Roger Davis, and Kathryn Leigh Scott, reprised their roles. 1971 saw the release of Night of Dark Shadows, also directed by Dan Curtis and written by Curtis and Sam Hall. Actors included David Selby, Grayson Hall, Kate Jackson, and Lara Parker, among others.

During the filming of House of Dark Shadows in 1970, several actors were written out of the TV series so that they would be available to shoot the movie. Kathryn Leigh Scott was absent from 30 episodes (986 to 1015); Jonathan Frid was absent from 28 episodes (983 to 1010); Grayson Hall was absent from 21 episodes (986 to 1006); John Karlen was absent from 21 episodes (990 to 1010); Nancy Barrett was absent from 20 episodes (991 to 1010): Louis Edmonds was absent from 17 episodes (991 to 1008); Don Briscoe was absent from 15 episodes (986 to 1000); Joan Bennett was absent from 15 episodes (991 to 1006); and David Henesy was absent from 9 episodes (993 to 1001).

Novels
There have been two series of Dark Shadows novels. The first, released during the show's original run, were all penned by romance writer Marilyn Ross, a pseudonym for author Dan Ross, and were published by Paperback Library. Ross also wrote a novelization of the theatrical film House of Dark Shadows.

The second series of novels were written by Lara Parker, Stephen Mark Rainey, and Elizabeth Massie.

Other books
{| class="wikitable"
! width="420" | Title
! width="125" | Release Date
! width="400" | Notes
|-
| Barnabas Collins in a Funny Vein
| December 1969
| Joke book.
|-
| Dark Shadows Cookbook
| 1970
| Non-fiction cookbook compiled by Jody Cameron Malis
|-
| The Dark Shadows Book of Vampires and Werewolves
| August 1970
| Collection of short stories.
|-
| Barnabas Collins: A Personal Picture Album
| December 1970
| Non-fiction book.
|-
| My Scrapbook Memories of Dark Shadows
| December 1986
| Non-fiction book by Kathryn Leigh Scott.
|-
| Dark Shadows in the Afternoon
| July 1991
| Non-fiction book by Kathleen Resch
|-
| The Dark Shadows Companion: 25th Anniversary Collection
| January 1993
| Non-fiction book by Kathryn Leigh Scott.
|-
| The Dark Shadows Program Guide
| 1995
| Non-fiction book compiled by Ann Wilson
|-
| The Dark Shadows Almanac: 30th Anniversary Tribute
| August 1995
| Non-fiction book by Kathryn Leigh Scott.
|-
| The Dark Shadows Collectibles Book
| 1998
| Non-fiction book by Craig Hamrick.
|-
| The Dark Shadows Movie Book
| July 1998
| Non-fiction book by Kathryn Leigh Scott.
|-
| Dark Shadows Memories
| May 2001
| Non-fiction book by Kathryn Leigh Scott.
|-
| Barnabas & Company: The Cast of the TV Classic Dark Shadows
| August 2003
| Non-fiction book by Craig Hamrick and R.J. Jamison.
|-
| Dark Shadows: The First Year
| 2006
| Non-fiction book compiled by Jim Pierson, Nina Johnson, O. Crock and Sy Tomashoff
|-
| Dark Shadows: Return to Collinwood| April 2012
| Non-fiction book by Kathryn Leigh Scott.
|}

Magazines
During its original run, Dark Shadows was featured in many magazines, including Afternoon TV, Castle of Frankenstein, Daytime TV, and Famous Monsters of Filmland. Even after the show ended, it received coverage in genre magazines of the 1970s, like Monsters of the Movies.

In 2003, a two-part article titled "Collecting Dark Shadows: Return to Collinwood", written by Rod Labbe, appeared in Autograph Collector magazine; it was the first major article to chronicle the show in years. In 2005, Scary Monsters Magazine devoted an entire issue (#55) to Dark Shadows. Included were full-length interviews with cast members Marie Wallace, David Selby, and Kathryn Leigh-Scott, as well as "Don't Open That Coffin! A Baby Boomer's Adventures in the Land of Dark Shadows!" Both the Autograph Collector and Scary Monsters articles were penned by freelance writer Rod Labbe, who once ran a fan club for Dennis Patrick (Jason McGuire, Paul Stoddard) in 1969–70.

Labbe also contributes to Fangoria magazine and is currently doing a series of full-length interviews with surviving original cast members, leading up to the release of Burton's film. Labbe's interview with Jerry Lacy, who played the nefarious Reverend Trask, appeared in issue #296. His second, with Kathryn Leigh-Scott, was in issue #304. The latest, a Chris Pennock (Jeb Hawkes, a.k.a. "The Leviathan") profile, is scheduled to run in issue #310. He has already interviewed Marie Wallace (Eve and Jenny Collins) for a future issue, with more to come. A lengthier version of Kathryn's interview can be found on her website.

Comics

From March 14, 1971, to March 11, 1972, the Newspaper Enterprise Association syndicated a Dark Shadows comic strip by illustrator Kenneth Bruce Bald (credited as "K. Bruce" because of contractual obligations) to dozens of newspapers across the United States. In 1996, Pomegranate Press, Ltd. published Dark Shadows: The Comic Strip Book, which collected the entire 52-week run of the daily and Sunday strip.

Gold Key Comics released 35 issues of a regular Dark Shadows comic book, mostly written by John Warner, which ran for years after the cancellation of the series on ABC (1969–1976); and in 1991, Innovation Publishing released a short-lived comic book series based on the NBC-TV revival show. Hermes Press has released a five-volume archive reprint series of the Gold Key series in 2010–2011. Additionally, Dynamite Entertainment launched a new monthly series of Dark Shadows comic books in October 2011.

Other media
There have also been two board games, a few coloring books, two jigsaw puzzles, and a View-Master reel.

Syndication
Due to an FCC rule prohibiting networks from keeping their syndication holdings, it wasn't until 1975 that the ABC-spun Worldvision Enterprises released 130 episodes to syndication. Eventually, all but the pre-Barnabas and approximately the last year's episodes were part of the package. During the 1980s, PBS was heavily involved in rebroadcasting the series. In 1992, the cable network the Sci-Fi Channel (now Syfy) acquired the entire run of episodes. The channel stopped airing Dark Shadows in 2003.

Online streaming site Netflix carried the series previous to 2012, but then dropped all but 160 episodes. The series was completely removed in early 2014. In June 2012, episodes 210-249 of Dark Shadows, covering the introduction of Barnabas Collins, were made available for streaming online video on Hulu, then a free service like YouTube. In October 2013, 200 episodes were offered on Hulu Plus, the new Hulu subscription service. As of April 2015, the non-subscription part of the service was discontinued and some of it was merged into the subscription side, dropping the Hulu Plus title and going by simply Hulu. After several years, the series was removed as of the summer of 2020.

Both the original soap opera and prime-time versions have aired on the Decades TV Network. Decades was known for its Halloween marathons of the show throughout the late 2010s that the network called The Binge. In 2018, 260 episodes of the program started airing at 12AM ET/11PM Central on weeknights. The MPI Media Group, who has the rights to the show's distribution, started a pay streaming service dedicated specifically to the program in October 2017. In January 2018, Amazon Prime was the first streaming service to carry every episode at once. However, in late 2019 it moved to the site’s IMDB TV Channel accompanied by commercials. The free ad-supported Tubi TV acquired rights to all 1,225 episodes in January 2020 and in September, the similar Pluto TV added a Dark Shadows channel.

Audio drama

Based on a 2003 stage play performed at a Dark Shadows convention, Return to Collinwood is an audio drama written by Jamison Selby and Jim Pierson, and starring David Selby, Kathryn Leigh Scott, John Karlen, Nancy Barrett, Lara Parker, Roger Davis, Marie Wallace, Christopher Pennock, Donna Wandrey, James Storm, and Terry Crawford. The show is available on CD.

Big Finish Productions
In 2006, Big Finish Productions continued the Dark Shadows saga with an original series of audio dramas, starring the original cast. The first season featured David Selby (Quentin Collins), Lara Parker (Angelique), Kathryn Leigh Scott (Maggie Evans), and John Karlen (Willie Loomis). Robert Rodan, who played Adam in the original series, also appears in the fourth story, playing a new character. Barnabas Collins is played by Andrew Collins. A second series was released in 2010. In addition to the cast's returning from Series One, Kingdom of the Dead also featured Lysette Anthony, Alec Newman, Lizzie Hopley, Jerry Lacy, and David Warner.
Big Finish has also produced a series of dramatic story readings based on the series, with arguably the most notable being the 2010 release The Night Whispers, in which Jonathan Frid reprised the role of Barnabas.

In January 2015, Big Finish began releasing the full-cast Dark Shadows serial Bloodlust in twice-weekly installments, as to emulate the initial soap opera format of the show.

Revivals

1991 TV series

In 1991, MGM Television produced a short-lived prime-time remake that aired on NBC from January 13 to March 22. The revival was a lavish, big-budget, weekly serial combining Gothic romance and stylistic horror. Although it was a huge hit at its introduction (watched by almost 1 in 4 households, according to official ratings during that time period), the onset of the Gulf War caused NBC to continually preempt or reschedule the episodes, resulting in declining ratings. It was canceled after the first season. The final episode ended with a cliffhanger: Victoria Winters (Joanna Going)'s learning that Barnabas Collins (Ben Cross) was a 200-year-old vampire.

It also starred veterans Jean Simmons (as Elizabeth Collins Stoddard) and Roy Thinnes (as Roger Collins), British character actress Lysette Anthony (as Angelique Collins), Barbara Steele (as Julia Hoffman), and Joseph Gordon-Levitt (as David Collins).

2004 TV pilot

Plans for another revival series (or film) have been discussed off and on since the 1991 series' demise, including a TV miniseries to wrap up the plotlines of the canceled NBC series and a feature film, co-written by Dan Curtis and Barbara Steele, utilizing the 1991 cast. In 2004, a pilot for a new WB network Dark Shadows series, starring Marley Shelton as Victoria Winters and Alec Newman as Barnabas Collins, was written and shot, but never picked up. The pilot has been screened at the Dark Shadows Festival conventions with Dan Curtis Productions' blessing, and it can now be found online. This pilot was produced by Warner Bros. Television.

2012 film

In 2012, Warner Bros. produced a film adaptation of the soap opera. Tim Burton directed the film, and Johnny Depp, finally realizing one of his childhood fantasies, starred as Barnabas Collins. However, the film treated the stories comedically, and was not the hoped-for major success.

Reincarnation
In September 2019, it was announced that The CW and Warner Bros. Television were developing a continuation of the original series called Dark Shadows: Reincarnation, written by Mark B. Perry. Perry would also serve as executive producer along with Amasia Entertainment's Michael Helfant, Bradley Gallo and Tracy Mercer, as well as Tracy and Cathy Curtis. Perry said, "As a first-generation fan, it's been a dream of mine to give Dark Shadows the Star Trek treatment since way back in the '80s when Next Generation was announced, so I'm beyond thrilled and humbled to be entrusted with this resurrection." In November 2020, TVLine reported that the series was no longer in development. In August 2021, Perry revealed that the project was retooled with the intention to shop it to networks again.

See also
List of vampire television series

Notes

References
Citations

Sources
 

Bibliography
 The Dark Shadows Companion: 25th Anniversary Collection, edited by Kathryn Leigh Scott, foreword by Jonathan Frid, Pomegranate Press, 1990. 
 Dark Shadows Almanac, edited by Kathryn Leigh Scott & Jim Pierson, Pomegranate Press, 1995. 
 Dark Shadows: The Comic Strip Book, by Kenneth Bruce Bald (illustrator), Pomegranate Press, 1996. 

Further reading
 Borzellieri, Frank. "The Physics of Dark Shadows". Cultural Studies Press, 2008. 
 Clute, John and Grant, John. The Encyclopedia of Fantasy. St. Martin's Press, 1999. p 823. 
 Hamrick, Craig and Jamison, R. J. Barnabas & Company: The Cast of the TV Classic Dark Shadows. iUniverse, 2012. 
 Jones, Stephen. The Essential Monster Movie Guide: A Century of Creature Features on Film, TV and Video. Watson-Guptill, 2000. p. 99. 
 Krensky, Stephen. Vampires. Lerner Publications, 2007. p. 48. 
 Mansour, David. From Abba to Zoom: A Pop Culture Encyclopedia of The Late 20th Century. Andrews McMeel Publishing, 2005. p. 109. 
 McNally, Raymond T. and Florescu, Radu R. In Search of Dracula: The History of Dracula and Vampires. Houghton Mifflin Books, 1994. p. 270. 
 Mitchell, Charles P. The Complete H. P. Lovecraft Filmography. Greenwood Press, 2001. p 220. 
 Riccardo, Martin V. Vampires Unearthed: The Complete Multi-media Vampire and Dracula Bibliography. Garland Publishing, Incorporated, 1983. p. 19. 
 Schemering, Christopher. The Soap Opera Encyclopedia. Ballantine Books, 1985. p. 61. 
 Senn, Bryan and Johnson, John. Fantastic Cinema Subject Guide: A Topical Index to 2500 Horror, Science Fiction, and Fantasy Films. McFarland & Co, 1992. p. 551. 
 South, Malcolm. Mythical and Fabulous Creatures: A Source Book and Research Guide. Greenwood Press, 1987. p. 260. 
 Sullivan, Jack. The Penguin Encyclopedia of Horror and the Supernatural. Viking, 1986. p. 422. 
 Terrance, Vincent. The Complete Encyclopedia of Television Programs, 1947–1979. A. S. Barnes & Company, 1979.
 Worland, Rick. The Horror Film: An Introduction''. Blackwell Publishing, 2006. p. 93.

External links

 
 
 
 Dark Shadows Online
 
Interview with “Dark Shadows” cast members Lara Parker and Kathryn Leigh Scott accessed October 29, 2016.

 
1966 American television series debuts
1971 American television series endings
American Broadcasting Company original programming
American fantasy television series
American gothic fiction
American horror fiction television series
American supernatural television series
American television soap operas
American time travel television series
Black-and-white American television shows
Dark fantasy television series
English-language television shows
Gold Key Comics titles
Gothic horror television series
Innovation Publishing titles
Television about magic
Television series about ghosts
Television series about parallel universes
Television shows adapted into comics
Television shows adapted into films
Television series by CBS Studios
Television shows set in Maine
Vampires in television
Television about werewolves
Witchcraft in television
Zombies in television
1960s American time travel television series